Tomás Borge Martínez (13 August 1930 – 30 April 2012), often spelled as Thomas Borge in American newspapers) was a cofounder of the Sandinista National Liberation Front in Nicaragua and was Interior Minister of Nicaragua during one of the administrations of Daniel Ortega. He was also a renowned statesman, writer, and politician. Tomás Borge also held the titles of "Vice-Secretary and President of the FSLN", member of the Nicaraguan Parliament and National Congress, and Ambassador to Peru. Considered a hardliner, he led the "prolonged people's war" tendency within the FSLN until his death.

In 2010, he stated in an interview: "I am proud to be a Sandinista, to continue being faithful to the red and black flag of our party, to continue being faithful to our revolutionary organization; and to die proud of raising the front, and not having been disloyal to my principles, nor disloyal with my friends nor my companions, nor with my flag, nor with my cries of war."

Early life
Borge was born in Matagalpa on August 13, 1930. His father, Tomás Borge Delgado, was one of Augusto César Sandino's deputy commanders during the United States occupation of Nicaragua, from 1926 to 1932. From a young age, Borge integrated himself in the fight against the Somoza family dictatorship, which had ruled Nicaragua since the assassination of Sandino. In 1943, he began participating in revolutionary activities, and in 1946, he was editing the newspaper "Espartako" against the regime of General Anastasio Somoza García.

Meeting Fonseca
After his secondary education, Borge enrolled into the Law Faculty of the National Autonomous University of Nicaragua-León in 1956. The following year, he met Carlos Fonseca with whom Borge would forge a strong friendship. Borge was six years older than Fonseca, which influenced Borge strongly. With Fonseca, Borge read the first few books that would forge their political philosophies: Utopia by Thomas More, some works by John Steinbeck, works by Karl Marx and Friedrich Engels, as well as some works by Lenin.

Along with Fonseca, Borge participated in a group of Marxist Nicaraguan students, who formed the Nicaraguan Socialist Party (PSN), which was based on Marxist thought and pro-Soviet leanings.

He was put under house arrest from 1956 to 1959 during the government crackdown following the assassination of Somoza by poet Rigoberto López Pérez. In 1959, he escaped to Honduras, where he was captured by the Honduran border patrol.

Otto Castro, a friend of both Borge and the president of Honduras at the time, arranged for Borge's release. Borge then travelled using a false passport to El Salvador and Costa Rica, where he would found the Juventud Revolucionaria Nicaragüense (Nicaraguan Youth Revolutionaries).

Foundation of Sandinista National Liberation Front

After the victorious Cuban Revolution, Fonseca, Borge, and a few companions decided to use militant tactics to fight against the Somoza regime. They participated in the formation of a militia under the command of Rigoberto López Pérez to face off against the National Guard of Nicaragua. The results were disastrous on July 24, 1959, when Fonseca was gravely injured. Then, Borge was in Costa Rica with Silvio Mayorga; they thought Fonseca had perished. Upon reuniting with Fonseca, the three left to Cuba and formed friendships with Che Guevara and Tamara Bunke, who had helped them with the guerilla.

In Cuba, Mayorga reunited with a group of young Nicaraguans from Venezuela, and they formed what would later be the "Frente Sandinista de Liberación Nacional" (National Sandinista Liberation Front). The name was derived from Augusto Sandino to convince Nicaraguans that Sandino's revolution was not dead. Also, the name Sandino was widely used to elicit strong emotion for the cause using the fallen leader's popularity. Fonseca traveled to Honduras to prepare the logistics that would permit the establishment of the group. On July 23, 1961, in Tegucigalpa, Borge, along with Carlos Fonseca, Francisco Buitrago, Jorge Navarro, Silvio Mayorga, José Benito Escobar, Noel Guerrero, and Germán Pomares, formed the FSLN, which would be the key to the downfall of the Somoza regime and the start of the Sandinista Revolution.

The FSLN was established in Honduras on the banks of the Patuka River. In 1962, the FSLN had 60 men in its ranks. Borge crossed into Nicaragua to recruit more members to the Sandinista cause.

Insurrection

Between 1965 and 1966, Tomás Borge headed the Sandinista newspaper "The Republican Mobilization." The next year, he tried again to create an active guerrilla group in the mountains near the Pancasán region, which was defeated. In 1969, the National Directorate of the FSLN (Borge was a member) named Fonseca as secretary general.

In January 1969, along with Ruiz, Borge was arrested for arms smuggling on the border with Costa Rica. Both are deported to Colombia; there begins a period of exile that took him to Cuba and Peru. In that time, he also visited the base of the Palestine Liberation Organization in Lebanon, passed by Mexico, and eventually returned to the ranks of the FSLN in Nicaragua.

On February 4, 1976, he was arrested and in the course of the arrest, Borge killed the young lieutenant leading the police patrol.He was sent to prison, where he was tortured. While in prison, the FSLN suffered several defeats and heavy losses. Fonseca perished in Zinica (Waslala, North Caribbean Coast Autonomous Region of Nicaragua). Borge was in prison in Matagalpa; a colonel in the National Guard told him the news of Fonseca's death, to which Borge said

In August 1978, Borge was one of the highest ranking Sandinistas released from prison after the spectacular Sandinista raid (Operation Chanchera) on the Nicaraguan National Palace by 19 commandos, headed by Edén Pastora (Commander Zero) that took the entire Congress hostage.

The FSLN is divided into three factions and Tomás Borge lead the Prolonged Popular War fraction (GPP). On January 7, 1979, the FSLN came to an agreement on reunification, which was formalized in March, and Borge became one of the nine members of the National Directorate.

The triumphant guerrilla troops entered Managua on 19 July 1979. Days earlier, on July 11, Borge attended a meeting of the National Directorate along with Daniel Ortega, Sergio Ramirez and Miguel d' Escoto in Costa Rica at the home of President Rodrigo Carazo Odio in Puntarenas with William Boudlerom, representative of the US government. At that meeting, Borge rejected the proposal to replace Somoza with Urcuyos Maliaños Francisco, President of the Congress, as established in the Constitution of 1974 would take place in the absence of the president. Somoza fled on 17 July and Urcuyos was named president.

Not too long after, Urcuyos was overthrown and power was passed to the Joint Government of National Reconstruction.

The revolution

On July 19, 1979, FSLN troops entered Managua and proclaimed the Sandinista Revolution. Borge, reputed to be the most radical of the nine commanders of the Front, was a member of the National Directorate of the FSLN and took charge of the Ministry of Interior (overseeing the Sandinista Police, prisons, immigration, Directorate General of State Security and Fire), a position he maintained until the loss of the presidential election in February 1990.

His first task in office was the dissolution of the National Guard and the reviewing of the cases of former Somoza government officials. He also attempted to eliminate crimes (moderate and minor), vagrancy, gambling and drinking.

Tomás Borge was part of the first revolutionary government delegation which visited the Soviet Union on March 17, 1980. On the trip, he described the situation in his country as follows:

On July 19, 1981, in celebration of the third anniversary of the revolution, Borge reiterated that national unity, pluralism and a mixed economy were designed to strengthen, not to destabilize the revolutionary process. It was another warning to the opposition and entrepreneurs. At the same time, he ordered the dismissal of any officer who abused their authority.

In 1982, Tomás Borge was elected vicepresident of the Permanent Conference of Political Parties in Latin America, an association of social democratic, socialist, liberal and nationalist parties on the continent.

After defeat
After the electoral defeat of 1990, some members of the National Directorate abandoned politics, and the FSLN underwent a transformation into the Sandinista Renovation Movement (MRS). Borge and Bayardo Arce with Daniel Ortega were the only members who remained in the FSLN.

Between 1997 and 2002, he was a member of the Central American Parliament, Parlacén, and since 2001, a member of the National Assembly.

Return to power
In the presidential elections held on November 5, 2006, the Sandinista candidate Daniel Ortega won with 38% of the vote.  Borge increased his influence in the government. On March 22, 2007, at his request, he was appointed Ambassador of Nicaragua to Peru, where he served until his death. His appointment was seen as a retreat from political life.

Death
On April 6, 2012, Borge entered the Military Hospital Alejandro Dávila Bolaños in Managua where he underwent a video-assisted thoracic surgery for a lung condition which had been progressing (according to some unofficial sources, he had cancer because he traveled to Cuba without being treated first). On April 9, he was transferred to the Intensive Care Unit after a respiratory complication developed while staying under medical supervision. On April 30, Rosario Murillo, coordinator of the Communication and Citizenship Council, published news of his death, which had occurred at 20:55 p.m. that night. At the time of his death, Tomás Borge was 81 and had continued staying active in politics as ambassador in Lima, Peru.

Borge was the last survivor of the founders of the FSLN and one of its most important figures. Rosario Murillo said in reporting his death that Borge, as Borge had said of Carlos Fonseca, is "among the dead that never die."

Official acts were performed in his honor at the National Palace of Culture, former National Palace, where the chapel once stood. Tomás Borge was buried in the mausoleum of Carlos Fonseca, at the Revolution Square in Managua and the government decreed three days of national mourning.

Criticism
Borge was accused of exerting pressure against the Catholic Church hierarchy and accused it of siding with the Contras. Borge also established the censorship of the press, which was clarified after errors as well as compulsory military service.

The Misquitos accused Borge, among others, of the displacement and killing of those who opposed the Sandinista government, as told by the President of the Permanent Commission on Human Rights of the Organization of American States(OAS), Marcos Carmona, to the FSLN and opposition in the context of an election campaign. Another accusation against Borge was that he gave the order to kill 37 dissidents imprisoned in Granada during the first term of Ortega. He was charged, along with the rest of the Sandinista government, after the victory of Violeta Chamorro in 1990, of the "Piñata Sandinista", where they were accused of confiscating public properties. The charges were always rejected by Borge.

He created the Council of Sandinista Defense (CDS), like the Cuban's CDR, and the current Council of Citizen Power.

He founded the open prisons, where prisoners were without custody, and the women's prison "La Esperanza", a novelty in Nicaragua.

In an interview with the newspaper Nuevo Diario of Nicaragua for the 30th anniversary of the Sandinista Revolution, Borge said:

In 2009, Swedish journalist and filmmaker Peter Torbiornsson accused Borge of having ordered the La Penca Bombing of 1984, in which seven people were killed, including three journalists, and a dozen seriously injured.  According to Torbiornsson, who survived the bombing, he had been asked by Renán Montero, a Cuban military officer who was working at the time for Borge's Ministry of the Interior, to meet with a man posing as a Danish news photographer and to escort him to the press conference convened by Contra leader Edén Pastora in his outpost at La Penca.  That man turned out to be the bomber.  Torbiornsson attempted to press charges against Montero, Borge, and former chief of state security Lenín Cerna for murder and crimes against humanity, but the Sandinista government of President Daniel Ortega refused to investigate the matter.

Private life
His first wife, Yelba Mayorga, was killed in 1979 during the guerrilla struggle and had 5 daughters. Later, he married Josephine Cerda and had several children with her. In 2007, he married the Peruvian actress Marcela Perez Silva and had three children with her.

Writings
Borge was the author of several works of poetry, essays, and an autobiography. The Cuban poet Roberto Fernandez Retamar believes that Borge's book "Carlos, el amanecer no es sólo un sueño", which he wrote in prison, is comparable in literary merit to the documentary prose of Gabriel García Márquez.

Some of his published titles are "The Patient Impatience", "A Grain of Corn", and "The Anticipated Ceremony".

 . 2009. Un grano de maíz: conversación con Fidel Castro. Editor Aldilá, 243 pp. 
 . 1989. La historia de Maizgalpa. Tambor de Tacuarí. Editor Ediciones Colihue 22 pp.  en línea

See also
FSLN
Sandinista Revolution
Augusto Sandino
Nicaragua
Contras
Nicaraguan Revolution
Fidel Castro
Che Guevara
Régis Debray
Hugo Chávez

References

External links
 author page at Curbstone Press

1930 births
2012 deaths
People from Matagalpa Department
Nicaraguan essayists
Male essayists
Nicaraguan male writers
Nicaraguan revolutionaries
Nicaraguan torture victims
Sandinista National Liberation Front politicians
Interior ministers of Nicaragua
Ambassadors of Nicaragua to Peru
Nicaraguan escapees
Escapees from Nicaraguan detention
People of the Nicaraguan Revolution